Burmese diaspora refers to citizens of Burma (Myanmar) who have moved abroad, regardless of ethnicity. Burma contains over 100 different ethnic groups, though the term "Burmese" can be used to refer to the Bamar ethnicity.

One of the smaller Asian diaspora, the most, between 1.5 and 2 million Burmese nationals live in neighboring Thailand, the largest destination for Burmese migrants. Some half a million work in Malaysia. Burmese migrants also make up the largest expatriate group in China, numbering over 350,000. Significant numbers also reside in United Kingdom, Japan followed by Singapore, Indonesia, Australia, Bangladesh, India, Ireland and the United States.  

Also included are many Anglo-Burmese, primarily in Australia, the UK, New Zealand, Canada and the US.

References